Chilka railway station is a railway station on the East Coast Railway network in the state of Odisha, India. It serves Chilka village. Its code is CLKA. It has four platforms. Passenger, MEMU, Express trains halt at Chilka railway station.

Major trains

 East Coast Express
 Hirakhand Express
 Bhubaneshwar–Visakhapatnam Intercity Express
 Puri–Tirupati Express

See also
 Khordha district

Gallery

References

Railway stations in Khorda district
Khurda Road railway division